Barharia Assembly constituency is an assembly constituency in Siwan district in the Indian state of Bihar.

Overview
As per the Delimitation of Parliamentary and Assembly constituencies Order, 2008, No. 110 Barharia Assembly constituency is composed of the following: Pachrukhi community development block; Tarwara, Kunwa, Rasulpur, Padrauna Khurd, Koirigawa, Balapur, Madhopur, Barasara, Barharia, Sadarpur, Tetahli, Nawalpur, Bahuara Kadir, Bahadurpur, Hardobara, Bhamopali, Rachhopali, Rampur, Bhopatpur, Sikandarpur, Bhaluara, Hariharpurlalgarh, Chaukhi Hasan and Dindayalpur gram panchayats of Barharia CD Block.

Barharia Assembly constituency is part of No. 18 Siwan (Lok Sabha constituency). Atkhambha is also a big village in barharia constituency.

Members of Legislative Assembly

Election results

2020

References

External links
 

Assembly constituencies of Bihar
Politics of Siwan district